Walter Dundas (died 1634) was a Scottish landowner and courtier.

He was the eldest son of George Dundas of Dundas and Margaret Boswell, a sister of John Boswell of Balmuto. Walter Dundas was Laird of Over Newliston, and he later inherited Dundas Castle.

He was knighted at the baptism of Prince Henry at Stirling Castle in August 1594. It is said that James VI asked him to bring silver spoons and lend him a pair of silver stockings. James VI sent him an invitation to the baptism of Prince Charles in December 1600 at Holyrood House, asking for venison, wild meat, "brissel foulis", and capons.

At Linlithgow Palace there was a private stair leading to the king's apartments. Walter Dundas encountered the queen, Anne of Denmark, on the stair way in the dark without recognising her, and mentioned this to James VI. The king recognised his wife from his description and ordered him not to use the route in future.

Marriages and family
He married Janet Oliphant, a daughter of Alexander Oliphant of Kellie. Their children included:
 Elizabeth Dundas, who married James Dundas of Newliston
 Margaret Dundas, who married William Scharpe of Pitleckie
 Isobel Dundas, who married John Sandilands, Lord Torphichen

His second wife was Anne Monteith. Their children included:
 George Dundas of Dundas
 William Dundas
 Walter Dundas
 Alexander Dundas
 Marion Dundas

References

Court of James VI and I
1634 deaths